Zakariya Lovelace (born 23 January 2006) is an English professional footballer who plays for Rangers as a forward. Born in England, Lovelace is eligible to play for Jamaica through family heritage.

Career
In 2019, Lovelace joined Millwall from Glebe after scoring 26 goals in 15 appearances en route to Glebe's Kent Youth League victory. On 29 December 2021, after scoring 21 goals in 19 appearances throughout Millwall's youth teams, Lovelace made his debut as a late substitute in Millwall's 1–0 win over Coventry City, becoming Millwall's second youngest ever player in the process. 

On 4 July 2022, Lovelace signed for Scottish club Rangers, initially linking up with the club's academy. He made his debut for the club in the League Cup against then Scottish League One side Queen of the South on 30 August 2022.

Career statistics

References

External links
 

2006 births
Living people
Association football forwards
English footballers
Millwall F.C. players
Rangers F.C. players
Black British sportspeople
English Football League players
Lowland Football League players